Sherlock Time is an Argentine comic book by Héctor Germán Oesterheld and Alberto Breccia.

Premise
The retiree Julio Luna buys a mansion in San Isidro, whose previous owners disappeared in strange circumstances. It turns out that the tower of the mansion is actually a spaceship used to abduct people, but Luna is saved from that fate by Sherlock Time. From then on, Luna helps Time with his investigations, usually involving aliens and supernatural events.

Editorial history
Sherlock Time was first published in Hora Cero extra #5, in 1958. Eleven short stories were published in Hora Cero Extra and Hora Cero Semanal, ending in 1959. The stories were reprinted in the comic book El Eternauta, also by Editorial Frontera, and in Pif Paf, by Ediciones Record. Ediciones Colihue published a trade paperback with all the stories in 1997.

Reception
Comic book artist Juan Sasturain considers the comic a breakthrough in the genre. It was the first important joint work by Breccia and Oesterheld, the first episode was the best comic that Breccia made up to that point, and Oesterheld explored genres that he had not worked with previously. Sasturain considers that, with its mixture of horror and science fiction, Sherlock Time was unlike any other comic produced before.

References

1958 comics debuts
1959 comics endings
Comics by Héctor Germán Oesterheld
Comics characters introduced in 1958
Fictional Argentine people
Horror comics
Science fiction comics